Gudrun Lindvall (born 1948) is a Swedish Green Party politician and schoolteacher. She served as a member of the Riksdag from 1994 to 2002.

References

1948 births
Living people
Members of the Riksdag from the Green Party
Women members of the Riksdag
Members of the Riksdag 1994–1998
Members of the Riksdag 1998–2002
21st-century Swedish women politicians
Swedish schoolteachers